Duara is a surname. Notable people with the surname include:

Prasenjit Duara (born 1950), Indian-American historian of China
Srutimala Duara, Indian writer